Mark Fisher (March 24, 1895January 2, 1948) was an American songwriter. Born in Philadelphia, Pennsylvania, he died in Long Lake, Illinois.

Career
Many of his compositions were joint ventures with Joe Goodwin and Larry Shay (see Shay, Fisher, and Goodwin). Another collaborator was Joe Burke. Fisher's songs include "Remembering", "When You're Smiling", and "Oh, How I Miss You Tonight".  As a performer he was bandleader for a number of Chicago area hotels, most notably the Marine Room at the Edgewater Beach Hotel.

Personal life
Married at age 19 to Lenora, he was father to five children: Mildred, William, Ann Ella, Mark Jr, and Lenora.

References

External links
 Biography of Mark Fisher on IMDb

1895 births
1948 deaths
Songwriters from Pennsylvania
Writers from Philadelphia
Musicians from Philadelphia
20th-century American musicians